Iván Alejandro García Navarro (born 25 October 1993) is a Mexican diver. He is nicknamed "Pollo" ("Chicken"). He competes in diving and represented Mexico at the 2012 Summer Olympics in London. He won a silver medal in the 10m Synchronized Platform with his partner Germán Sánchez with a high score of 468.90. In the individual 10m Platform, García came the 7th with a score of 521.65.

He won two gold medals in both the individual and synchronized 10m Platform in the 2011 Pan-American Games. At the 2012 Summer Olympics in London García won the silver medal in the synchronized 10 metre platform diving, with his partner Germán Sánchez. At the 2015 Pan American Games, he retained the gold medal in the individual 10m platform back to back. In Rio 2016 he finished 10th on the individual platform.

Technical Features
Iván García is a talented diver who can perform the most difficult dives all over the world. He has mastered a series of the most difficult dives since 2012. The dives which he uses now in the competition and their difficult degrees are respectively Forward 4 Somersaults-Tuck 109C(3.7), Back 3 Somersaults-Tuck 207C(3.3), Reverse 3 Somersaults-Tuck 307C(3.4), Inward 4 Somersaults-Tuck 409C(4.1), Forward 2 Somersaults 3 Twists-Pike 5156B(3.8) and Armstand Back 2 Soms 2 Twists-Free 6245D(3.6). The total difficult degrees of his dives is 21.9, which is the highest in the world. Iván García is able to dive either the most difficult dive or the second most difficult dive in each of the six diving groups(forward, backward, reverse, inward, twisting and armstand groups). Among these dives, 409C is the most difficult dive being used around the world currently. In 2012 London Olympic Games, Iván García and his partner Germán Sánchez placed second in the synchronized platform—the best performance of Mexicans in synchronized diving. However, due to the difficulty of his dives, he cannot perform perfectly all the time.

Competitive history
Iván García has turned to be a professional diver in 2009 in the FINA World Aquatics Championships. From then on, representing Mexico, he has been competing for FINA World Junior Diving Championships, FINA World Aquatics Championships, Youth Olympic Games, Olympic Games, FINA Diving World Cup, FINA Diving World Series, Pan American Games and Central American and Caribbean Games. He has won many medals of those competitions from 2010. He is an Olympic silver medalist in 2012 and a bronze medalist in YOG(Youth Olympic Games) in 2010. In the FINA Diving World Cup in 2014, he won his first medal in the individual 10m Platform in a world-class competition. What's more, he has won two gold medals in the Pan American Games in 2011, four gold medals in the Central American and Caribbean Games in 2010, 2014, and 2018.

@with Germán Sánchez#with Zuñiga Adan

?with Jonathan Ruvalcaba*with Arantxa Chávez

^with Andreas Isaac Villarreal§Veracruz, MEX held two legs of 2010 FINA Diving World Series.† Guadalajara, MEX held two legs of 2013 FINA Diving World Series.% With different pairs.

References

1993 births
Mexican male divers
Sportspeople from Guadalajara, Jalisco
Divers at the 2010 Summer Youth Olympics
Divers at the 2011 Pan American Games
Pan American Games gold medalists for Mexico
Divers at the 2012 Summer Olympics
Divers at the 2016 Summer Olympics
Divers at the 2020 Summer Olympics
Olympic divers of Mexico
Medalists at the 2012 Summer Olympics
Olympic medalists in diving
Olympic silver medalists for Mexico
Living people
World Aquatics Championships medalists in diving
Pan American Games medalists in diving
Divers at the 2015 Pan American Games
Universiade medalists in diving
Central American and Caribbean Games gold medalists for Mexico
Competitors at the 2010 Central American and Caribbean Games
Competitors at the 2014 Central American and Caribbean Games
Universiade bronze medalists for Mexico
Divers at the 2019 Pan American Games
Central American and Caribbean Games medalists in diving
Medalists at the 2013 Summer Universiade
Medalists at the 2011 Pan American Games
Medalists at the 2015 Pan American Games
Medalists at the 2019 Pan American Games
20th-century Mexican people
21st-century Mexican people